The Consortium of Liberal Arts Colleges (CLAC) is a nonprofit organization of 75 American liberal arts colleges which formed in 1984 under the leadership of Oberlin College's president S. Frederick Starr. CLAC brings together the IT professionals from its member colleges and universities to help those institutions make the best use of technology to enrich students’ learning, facilitate teaching and research, and to support the business of the higher education. CLAC has been supporting collaboration, knowledge sharing, professional growth of its IT members, and advocacy for the liberal arts at the national level  for more three decades.

The organization celebrated its 20th Annual Conference in 2018.

Members

Albion College
Allegheny College
Alma College
Amherst College
Barnard College
Bates College
Beloit College
Bowdoin College
Bryn Mawr College
Bucknell University
Carleton College
Claremont McKenna College
Colby College
Colgate University
College of Saint Benedict and Saint John's University
College of the Holy Cross
College of Wooster
Colorado College
Connecticut College
Davidson College
Denison University
DePauw University
Dickinson College
Earlham College
Franklin and Marshall College
Gettysburg College
Grinnell College
Hamilton College
Hampshire College
Harvey Mudd College
Haverford College
Hobart and William Smith Colleges
Hope College
Kalamazoo College
Kenyon College
Lafayette College
Lake Forest College
Lawrence University
Luther College
Macalester College
Manhattan College
Middlebury College
Mills College
Morehouse College
Mount Holyoke College
Oberlin College
Occidental College
Ohio Wesleyan University
Pomona College
Reed College
Rhodes College
Saint Michael's College
Sewanee: The University of the South
Skidmore College
Smith College
Southwestern University
Spelman College
St. Lawrence University
St. Olaf College
Swarthmore College
Trinity College
Trinity University
Union College
Vassar College
Wabash College
Washington College
Washington and Lee University
Wellesley College
Wesleyan University
Wheaton College (Illinois)
Wheaton College (Massachusetts)
Whitman College
Whittier College
Williams College

References

External links
Official website

College and university associations and consortia in the United States
.
Educational institutions established in 1984
1984 establishments in the United States